Adam Jarzębski (c. 1590 in Warka – c. 1648 in Warsaw) was an early Baroque Polish composer, violinist, poet, and writer. The first documented mention of Jarzębski was in 1612, when he became a member of the chapel of John Sigismund, Elector of Brandenburg in Berlin. After he had stayed in Italy for a year (1615–16), he became a member of the royal musical establishment, first at the court of Sigismund III Vasa and then of Władysław IV. He was held in great esteem by the royal court and was very popular among the members of the patriciate of Warsaw. In 1635 he managed the construction of the royal palace at Ujazdów. In 1643 he published a literary work Gościniec, albo krótkie opisanie Warszawy (The Main Road, or a Short Description of Warsaw) describing the customs and the musical life of the town. He died in Warsaw in 1649. He was an outstanding figure in the history of the Polish culture of the 17th century.

He composed mainly instrumental music. Canzoni é Concerti (27 works) is the first major collection of Polish compositions for instrumental ensembles (2-, 3-, 4- part and basso continuo). With regard to form and compositional technique his works did not depart from the most valuable models of his genre in Europe. Most frequently the composer indicated only registers and various combinations of voices: he mentions particular instruments only occasionally. Some works are based on a vocal original, the remaining ones are original instrumental works (concertos and canzonas). Only two vocal works survive: the canon More veterum and a fragment of the mass Missa sub concerto.

External links
Short biography

1590s births
1640s deaths
Polish Baroque composers
Polish classical composers
Polish male classical composers
17th-century classical composers
17th-century male musicians